Telmo Carbajo was a Peruvian football club, playing in the city of Callao, Lima, Peru.

History
The Club Atlético Telmo Carbajo participated in the Segunda Division Peruana and was the champion in the 1936, 1940 and 1943 seasons by which could participate in the 1937 Peruvian Primera División, but was relegated in the same year. 

After, the club have played at the highest level of Peruvian football on two occasions, from 1941 until 1942 when was relegated.

Honours

National
Peruvian Segunda División:
Winners (3): 1936, 1940, 1943
Runner-up (1): 1944

Liga Provincial del Callao:
Winners (3): 1938, 1940, 1960
Runner-up (6): 1934, 1935, 1939, 1957, 1958, 1961

See also
List of football clubs in Peru
Peruvian football league system

External links
 Segunda Division champions

Football clubs in Peru